Kolej Sains Pendidikan Islam Negeri Terengganu (KOSPINT) is a boarding secondary school located in Kuala Terengganu, Terengganu, Malaysia. KOSPINT has been awarded the status of a Bestari School (Smart School) equipped for high technology education.

History
The concept of KOSPINT was conceived by JKKK with co-operation from UMNO Dun Serada in 1986. In 1988, an application was submitted to the State Government to apply for the school to be built on a  site. The Government agreed the budget for the school construction in early 1995 and work started in November 1995. After the construction was completed, the Terengganu Religion Department proposed this new school as a Bestari School, where the students would be selected from the best that got four As in the UPSR (Ujian Pernilaian Sekolah Rendah) examination. On 8 June 1997 the school opened with 265 students supported by 26 teachers.

School System
Since 2008, mandatory military drill and training manoeuvre are administered during the school years of the students. This includes strict dress code and time management. Before first period of academic activity, students are required to perform a short march to check for body stability. If the students are found of being unable to follow time management and orders from their higher-ups, physical punishment consisting of extra strength training will be administered. Each of student residential block will be administered by a military officer.

Every Saturday, students are required to join an activity called 'Kawad Pagi', which is administered by their respective military trainer. This activity includes several around-the-field run, military style marching, and other physical exercises. Students that are unable to join must state a valid excuse. Otherwise, suitable punishment will be handed.

Being an Islam-exclusive school, the students are also required to meditate and cleanse their mind before entering academic class. Short recitation of 'Al-Ma'thurat' is conducted every morning. Students also encouraged to enhance their spiritual strength and improve their motivation in any means suitable.

Academic standards
The Penilaian Menengah Rendah 2003 examination produced an outstanding result with 75% of students achieving Grade A.

References

Schools in Terengganu
Boarding schools in Malaysia
Secondary schools in Malaysia
Educational institutions established in 1997
1997 establishments in Malaysia